Fanøya is an island in Kinn Municipality in Vestland county, Norway. The Batalden Chapel is located on Fanøya.

See also
List of islands of Norway

References

Islands of Vestland
Kinn